Elsa Maria Karin Andersson (August 17, 1915 in Malmö Municipality – November 16, 1996 in Malmö Municipality) was a Swedish artist. She was the daughter of Rudolf Thornberg and Bengta Olsson and in 1939 married Knut Andersson. She was taught decorative painting by her father between 1931 and 1933 while she studied at the teaching school in the city of Malmö. She studied at the Reimann School in Berlin in 1934 and made field trips to Dresden and Berlin. She assisted her father with the decoration of Wesley Church in Limhamn in 1949. Her easel art consist of watercolors and pastel paintings.

References
Svenskt konstnärslexikon, part one (1), page: 65, Allhems Förlag, Malmö

1915 births
1996 deaths
People from Malmö Municipality
Swedish artists
20th-century Swedish people